Lotfollah Safi Golpaygani (20 February 1919 – 1 February 2022) was an Iranian Grand Ayatollah. He was at one point the most senior Twelver Shia scholar (Marja') in Iran until his death. He resided in Qom and taught Islam in the Qom Seminary.

Personal life and education 
Lotfollah was born in Golpayegan on 20 February 1919 into a religious family. His father, Mohammad Javad Safi Golpaygani, was a high ranking Shia scholar (Marja'). His mother, known as Fatemeh Khanom, was the daughter of a Mujtahid called Akhund Mohammad Ali. His brother, Ali Safi Golpaygani was also a high ranking Shia scholar. He is also the son-in-law of Mohammad-Reza Golpaygani, and father-in-law of Ayatollah Ali Karimi Jahromi.

While a child in Golpayegan, he was first introduced to basic books in Arabic literature Jalil al-Qadr, and Mullah Abu al-Qasim known as "Qutb". He continued his Islamic Studies with his father in Golpeygan, while there his father taught him Islamic Theology (Aqidah), Interpretation of the Quran (Tafsir), Hadith, Islamic Jurisprudence (Fiqh), Principles of Islamic jurisprudence (Usool Fiqh), as well as several other subjects. At the age of 22 in 1941, he left Golpeyegan and settled in Qom to further his Islamic Studies in the Qom Seminary. After spending a few years there, he visited Najaf to attend the Hawza Najaf for approximately 1 year, then returned back to Qom to partake in advanced Islamic Studies (Darse Kharej). He would spend the next 15 years there learning and attending lessons under many high ranking Shia scholars, as well as debating Islamic Mysticism.

Teachers 
Lotfollah Safi Golpaygani's teachers and tutors included Hossein Borujerdi, Seyyed Mohammad Hojjat Kooh Kamari, Sadr al-Din al-Sadr, and  Mohammad-Reza Golpaygani.

Political activities 
Before the 1979 Iranian revolution, Lotfollah was a critic of the Shah, Mohammad Reza Pahlavi. SAVAK had banned some of his works in Iran as a response to this. After the revolution, he was elected by the of Markazi province to represent them in the Assembly for the Final Review of the Constitution. Ruhollah Khomeini also appointed him to be the secretary in the Guardian Council.

Works 
Throughout his life, Lotfollah Safi Golpaygani published over 100 works in both Persian and Arabic. Here are some of them.

 al-Taazil: Anvah va Molhaghate (Taazil: it's types and its accessories) - Winner of Iran's Book of the Year Awards
 The Way of Reforming or Enjoining in Good, and Forbidding Evil 
 Hajj Travelogue 
 Hajj 
 Prayers in Arafat 
 An Attitude Towards Mysticism and Philosophy 
 A Ray of Greatness of Imam Hussein (as) - Winner of Provincial Book of the Year in Iran
 Diwan (poetry)
 Weeping for Imam Hussein 
 Aware Martyr 
 Ramadan in the History of Historical Events 
 Theology in Nahj al-Balagha
 The Call for Islam in Europe 
 Events Around the Day of Ghadir 
 Judgment Between Sheikh Saduq and Sheikh Mofid 
 Biography of Mullah Mohammad Javad Safi 
 Oqat Salawat
 A Detailed Introduction of 'Muqtadab al-Athar', 'Makial al-Makarem', and 'Muntaqi al-Jaman'
 Comments on the Treatise of al-Jabr and al-Qadr 
 Jabir ibn Hayyan

Views

Shahin Najafi 
When Shahin Najafi released a song called "Naghi", he angered many Shia Muslims in Iran, and around the world. In the song, Shahin was accused of insulting the 10th Imam of The Twelve Imams, Ali al-Hadi. He also depicted the Imam Reza Shrine (shrine of 8th Imam, Ali al-Ridha) in a sexual manner representing a woman's breast, alongside a rainbow flag. Two weeks prior to the release of his song, a Fatwa was issued by Safi Golpaygani claiming those who insult the Imams should be issued a death penalty. It was after the release of his song that this Fatwa was then issued for Shahin Najafi.

Criticism of Mysticism 
Safi Golpaygani was a critic of Islamic Mysticism, he was also a critic of Hassan Hassanzadeh Amoli. In a speech with Ahmad Mojtahedi Tehrani, he spoke against a poem of Rumi, and Hassan Amoli and said they are "against us". He is among several high ranking Shia scholars who reject Islamic Mysticism and claims it to be nothing but dreamy and artificial, and that the pursuit of such things is a waste of life.

Reducing poverty in Iran 
Safi Golpaygani often spoke out against poverty in Iran. He claimed that a just Islamic System should eradicate poverty. In an interview with Tasnim News Agency, he highlighted that the Imam Khomeini Relief Committee should focus on reducing poverty and social problems in Iran.

Calling for Iran to establish good relations with all countries around the World 
On 21 October 2021, Mohammad Bagher Ghalibaf met with Safi Golpaygani. Lotfollah emphasised the need for Iran to establish good relations with all nations around the world. He was very concerned about the economic situation, and the problems the people are facing. 

After this, he received criticism from several outlets, most notably from Hossein Shariatmadari with Kayhan newspaper.

Condemnation of the Taliban 
After the Taliban took control of Afghanistan in August 2021, there was a fear among the Shia of Afghanistan as to what would happen to them due to their Persecution in Afghanistan under the Taliban. Safi Golpaygani issued a message for the World to help the people of Afghanistan.

Death 
In the early hours of Tuesday, 1 February 2022, Lotfollah Safi Golpaygani died in a hospital in Qom due to a cardiac arrest at the age of 102. His death was mourned by many Shias around the World, figures such as Ali Khamenei, Ali al-Sistani and Hossein Wahid Khorasani sent a message of condolence on his death. His funeral took place on 2 February in Qom, many attended his funeral. His son-in-law Ali Karimi Jahromi led his funeral prayers.

His body was transferred to Karbala and was buried in the Imam Husayn Shrine on 3 February as per his will.

See also

Grand Ayatollahs
List of Marjas
List of deceased Maraji

References

External links
Official website

1919 births
2022 deaths
Iranian grand ayatollahs
Iranian Islamists
Shia Islamists
People from Golpayegan
Members of the Assembly of Experts for Constitution
Members of the Guardian Council
Iranian centenarians
Men centenarians